Spyrock (formerly, Spy Rock) is an unincorporated community of ranches in Mendocino County, California.  It is located around Sky Rock Road, which runs east of Highway 101 to the Eel River and Northwestern Pacific Railroad.

It is named after Spy Rock, a 540 ft landmark hill on the east side of the river, and The Wildlands Conservancy operates the 5,832 acres Spyrock reserve in the area.

A post office operated at Spyrock from 1910 to 1911, and from 1915 to 1967. Spy Rock Elementary School located on Spy Rock Road is in Laytonville Unified school district, although Spy Rock previously had its own school district.

There was a station on the railroad named Spy Rock which until 1914 was named Redwine.

In 1982 a Petroglyph site was discovered beside Spy Rock Road which provided the first evidence of complex rock art boulders in the western United States.

The Spy Rock Road album by The Lookouts was named after the road by Larry Livermore who lived in Spy Rock in the 1980s.

Spy Rock features prominently in the 2021 Hulu docuseries Sasquatch.

References

Unincorporated communities in California
Unincorporated communities in Mendocino County, California